A knowledge ark (also known as a doomsday ark or doomsday vault) is a collection of knowledge preserved in such a way that future generations would have access to said knowledge if all other copies of it were lost.

Scenarios where access to information (such as the Internet) would become otherwise impossible could be described as existential risks or extinction-level events. A knowledge ark could take the form of a traditional library or a modern computer database. It could also be pictorial in nature, including photographs of important information, or diagrams of critical processes. 

A knowledge ark would have to be resistant to the effects of natural or man-made disasters in order to be viable. Such an ark should include, but would not be limited to, information or material relevant to the survival and prosperity of human civilization.

Other types of knowledge arks might include genetic material, such as in a DNA bank. With the potential for widespread personal DNA sequencing becoming a reality, an individual might agree to store their genetic code in a digital or analog storage format which would enable later retrieval of that code. If a species was sequenced before extinction, its genome would still remain available for study.

Examples 

An example of a DNA bank is the Svalbard Global Seed Vault, a seedbank which is intended to preserve a wide variety of plant seeds (such as important crops) in case of their extinction.

The Memory of Mankind project involves engraving human knowledge on clay tablets and storing it in a salt mine. The engravings are microscopic.

A Lunar ark has been proposed which would store and transmit valuable information to receiver stations on Earth. The success of this would also depend on the availability of compatible receiver equipment on Earth, and adequate knowledge of that equipment's operation.

The Arch Mission Foundation sent the Lunar Library, a 30 million page knowledge ark designed to survive for millions or billions of years in space, to the moon on the Israeli Beresheet spacecraft in 2019. The spacecraft experienced a crash landing. However, the library likely survived intact.

The Phoenix mars lander (landed on surface of Mars in 2008) included the "Visions of Mars" DVD, a digital library about Mars designed to last for hundreds or thousands of years.

See also

 KEO
 Arctic World Archive
 Memory of the World Programme
 Survivalism

References

Knowledge
Biorepositories